The 2019 Go Bowling 250 is a NASCAR Xfinity Series race held on September 20, 2019, at Richmond Raceway in Richmond, Virginia. Contested over 250 laps on the 0.75 mile (1.2 km) asphalt short track, it was the 27th race of the 2019 NASCAR Xfinity Series season, first race of the Playoffs, and the first race of the Round of 12.

Background

Track

Richmond Raceway is a 3/4-mile (1.2 km), D-shaped, asphalt race track located just outside Richmond, Virginia in Henrico County. It hosts the Monster Energy NASCAR Cup Series and Xfinity Series. Known as "America's premier short track", it formerly hosted a NASCAR Gander Outdoors Truck Series race, an IndyCar Series race, and two USAC sprint car races. Richmond Raceway is also one of only a few tracks to host all of its events at night.

Entry list

Practice

Qualifying

Qualifying results

. – Playoffs driver

Race

Summary
Austin Cindric started on pole. On lap 6, Christopher Bell took the lead from him and dominated the race, winning both stages. Aside from a few minor cautions, the race was relatively caution free. Bell was able to prevent Cindric and Cole Custer from passing him and won the stages with more than a 1-second gap. Bell won the race over Cindric by nearly a 2-second margin, locking himself into the next round. Custer also clinched a spot in the next round in points.

Stage Results

Stage One
Laps: 75

Stage Two
Laps: 75

Final Stage Results

Stage Three
Laps: 100

. – Playoffs driver

References

NASCAR races at Richmond Raceway
ToyotaCare 250
Go Bowling 250
2019 NASCAR Xfinity Series